Varsity is the official student newspaper of the University of Cape Town (UCT). In 1942, the first edition of Varsity went to print.

History
The paper was founded as a result of the burgeoning cultural tensions on campus between Afrikaans and English students. The student representative council (SRC) sought to control these tensions by uniting the English student newspaper UCTattle and the Afrikaans medium publication Die Spantou. The SRC aimed to lessen the widening gap in political opinion advocated by each of these mouthpieces by launching a bilingual student newspaper.

A storm of controversy met the decision to abolish the original papers. The first Varsity constitution even had a clause forbidding comment on politics at UCT. The SRC was firm that "racial friction and political bitterness must be eliminated". The SRC took Varsity Newspaper firmly under its wing, with much indignation from the student body. The first editor, NC Gracie, chose the name claiming UCT had the right to the name "being the oldest [university] with the most inspiring record and the greatest tradition of tolerance and unity".

The newspaper grew in popularity as the years went on, and developed independence from the SRC, no longer merely acting as a puppet press. The paper maintained a spirit of liberalism during the apartheid years, with successive editors jailed and many editions incensing the National Party government. In fact, Varsity provided an important function during the years of censorship since it operated under different constraints to the mainstream press who were often shackled and prevented from reporting on the country's growing liberation struggle.

Many former staffers at Varsity have continued to work in the media industry in South Africa.

The current Editor-in-Chief of Varsity is Chloe Kingdom and the Deputy Editor is Lerato Botha.

See also
 UCT April
 South Africa's alternative press
 List of newspapers in South Africa

References

External links
Varsity Online

Student newspapers published in South Africa
University of Cape Town
Mass media in Cape Town
1942 establishments in South Africa
Newspapers established in 1942